The Woman on the Rack is a 1928 German silent drama film directed by Robert Wiene and starring Lili Damita, Vladimir Gajdarov, and Johannes Riemann. It was also known by the alternative title A Scandal in Paris. It was based on a British play by Edward Hemmerde and Francis Neilson. The wife of a British aristocratic politician, who is neglected by her husband, resists an attempt to break them up. When her husband discovers what he mistakenly believes to be a dalliance with another man he begins divorce proceedings. Eventually the truth comes out and the couple reconcile. The film was not considered one of Wiene's greatest achievements, but he was praised for directing with his usual competence while Damita's performance as Lady Admaston was hailed.

Cast
In alphabetical order

References

Bibliography

External links

1928 films
1928 drama films
German drama films
Films of the Weimar Republic
German silent feature films
Films directed by Robert Wiene
German films based on plays
Films set in England
Films set in London
Films set in Paris
German black-and-white films
Silent drama films
1920s German films